The Works of Ossian is an influential cycle of poems written by James Macpherson.

Ossian may also refer to:

Places
 Ossian, Indiana, United States, a town
 Ossian, Iowa, United States, a city
 Ossian, New York, United States, a town
 Loch Ossian, a lake in the Scottish Highlands

Music
 Ossian (band), a Scottish traditional band of the 1970s and 1980s
 Ossian D'Ambrosio, Italian heavy metal guitarist
 Ossian, ou Les bardes, an 1804 opera by Jean-François Le Sueur  
 Osjan or Ossian, a Polish 1970s rock band

Other uses
 Ossian (given name)
 Ossian (horse)
 Ossian Studios, a video game development company
 Oisín, or Ossian, legendary Irish poet

See also
Osian (disambiguation)